Pacific Dining Car was a two-location restaurant chain in California. It was founded in 1921 by Fred and Grace Cook in the backyard of a friend's house in Los Angeles. In 1990, it expanded to Santa Monica. In 2020, due to the COVID-19 pandemic, the restaurant ownership closed both locations, auctioning off the fixtures.

The restaurant is currently run by Wes Idol III, a grandson of the founders. It was open 24 hours a day, every day of the year, including Christmas and other holidays. The restaurant served as a set for movies and TV series such as Training Day and Shameless.

History 
Drawing inspiration from a business with a similar theme, Fred and Grace Cook pitched the idea of a modified railway dining car experience to a friend, who let them use his backyard to construct the dining car. The Cooks retrofitted their dining car to be more spacious, with plans for comfortable seating arrangements, based on an understanding that the typical railway dining experience was too cramped. When the modified dining car was completed, it was moved to a site at 7th and Westlake in Los Angeles.

In 1923, the Cook's 7th and Westlake location was bought out by a speculator, forcing the restaurant to relocate to its current site at 1310 W 6th Street in Los Angeles.

In 1927, a San Diego rancher offered to teach Fred how to select, hang, and age cuts of beef for steaks. This prompted the Cooks to age and hang their beef in a curing box on the restaurant premises.

During the Great Depression, Pacific Dining Car staff would invite the hungry to eat with them in the evenings. At the end of the day, any leftovers were donated to a nearby mission.

Pacific Dining Car founder Fred Cook died In 1947. Grace Cook continued to operate the restaurant until 1960, when she sold the restaurant to her daughter Virginia and son-in-law Wes Idol.    

Wes Idol died in 1970, with Virginia retaining ownership of the restaurant. Wes Idol II purchased Pacific Dining Car from his mother in 1975.     

In 2020, due to the COVID-19 pandemic, the restaurant ownership closed both locations, auctioning off anything contained within the restaurants, and moving all sales of meat online. The original building and kitchen were recommended in April 2022 by the Los Angeles Cultural Heritage Commission to be designated a Historic-Cultural Monument.

Menu 
The basic menus of the Pacific Dining Car were categorized by time to Breakfast, Lunch, Dinner, and Desserts. Additional menus include an Afternoon Tea menu, available only by appointment and a Late Night menu served between 10pm–6am. All the menus are available for delivery.

Clientele 
Due to the location of the Pacific Dining Car, located at downtown of Los Angeles, there is a large variety in the client list of the restaurant, ranging from stockbrokers, lawyers, to newspaper reporters and the occasional celebrity.

Columnist Louella Parsons alongside her husband, Dr. Martin, were among the notable guests of the Pacific Dining Car. Actor George Raft and columnist Sid Ziff also frequented the restaurant for steak. Infamous gangster Mickey Cohen and Mae West, a female icon of the era, were also regulars there.

Notable guests also include actors Nicolas Cage and Johnny Depp, as well as Mayor Eric Garcetti.

Media appearances 
As one of the oldest restaurants in L.A., Pacific Dining Car has appeared in several films and TV series. In 2001, it appeared in the film Training Day. In it, Denzel Washington recommends the "baseball steak" to Jake (played by Ethan Hawke), which led the restaurant to name the meatball steak "Training Day" on its lunch menu.

Pacific Dining Car has also been briefly presented in other films, such as Chinatown in 1974, Street Kings in 2008, and Rampart in 2011.

See also 
 Victoria Station

References

External links 
 

1921 establishments in California
Restaurants established in 1921
Restaurants in Los Angeles
Santa Monica, California